is a Japanese voice actress mainly for adult games. She was affiliated With Atelier Peach, now she is a freelancer.

Works in games

2009 (As Anzai Sari mainly)
Eve to Iu Na no Omocha - Chizuru
Wakan Saimin ~Osananajimi no Kanojo wa Saimin Playmates~ - Natori Shouko

2010
Cthulhu ~Otome no Fureru, Tenshi no Yubisaki~ - Kureo
Hime to Majin to Koi Suru Tamashii
JK to Inkou Kyoushi 3 ~Manbiki Shoujo Hen~ - Kuzumori Juri
Cthulhu ~Great Hunting~
Megami to Love! ~5nin no Megami-sama to Ichahame Haramase Shinkon Seikatsu~ - Sharu
Mamasen - Hagumi Tabuchi
Hissatsu Chikannin II - Rin Koibuchi, Fizz

2012
Chupi Chupi Otoko no Ko
Zettai Ryouiki ☆ Sex Royale!! ~Mujintou Okashiai Battle~
Grand Libra Academy
Aina - Aina
Sora to Kumo to Kimi no Koi
Namima no Kuni no Faust
Daten no Kioku Series

2013
Aozora Stripe - Satsuki Tsuruno
Imouto Paradise! 2 - Shizuku Nanase
Josou de Haramasete Gaiden ~Kako wa Yuuyami Iro no Shoujo to Tomo ni~ - Shigure Momosato
Josou Kaikyou - Meguru Munakata
Moshimo Ossan ga Auction Site de Shiriatta Kyonyuu Gal - Hitomi Shiraishi

2014
Otome ga Kanaderu Koi No Aria (Kanade Jougasaki)
Teito Hiten Daisakusen
Make Me Lover
AstralAir no Shiroki Towa - Corona
Pretty x Cation - Komachi Yakuouji
Ren'ai Made Sentakushi Hitotsu - Karen Hishikawa

2015
Yuki Koi Melt - Inaba Usagi
Tokeijikake no Ley Line -Asagiri ni Chiru Hana- -
Tou no Shita no Exercitus - Luana
Sono Kojou ni Yuusha Hou Ari! - Mira
Kami no Rhapsody - Fornisgein
Sakura no Uta - Natsuko Kuriyama

2016
Hataraku Otona no Ren'ai Jijou - Sayoko
Otome ga Irodoru Koi no Essence - Kanade Jougasaki
Anata o Otoko ni Shite Ageru! - Beniyuki Toumi
Onii-chan, Kiss no Junbi wa Mada Desu ka? - Saya Seguchi
Shoujo Minority -Nagusame no Ai-
Sakura Nova - Arisa Moegihara
Re: LieF ~Shin'ainaru Anata e~
Himekoi ＊ Sucreine!

2017
Ouchi ni Kaeru made ga Mashimaro Desu - Kanon
Omokage Railback
Golden Hour - Marika Kitakami
Ubu na Otome no Ecchi na Onegai - Hozumi
AstralAir no Shiroki Towa Finale -Shiroki Hoshi no Yume- - Corona

References

Japanese video game actresses
Japanese voice actresses
Year of birth missing (living people)
Living people